Grevenmacher is a commune with town status in eastern Luxembourg, near the border with Germany. It gives its name to and is the capital of the canton of Grevenmacher, and, until its abolition in 2015, the district of Grevenmacher. The town is situated on the left bank of the river Moselle, in a wine growing region.

, the commune of Grevenmacher has a population of 4,921.

Population

Twin towns — sister cities

Grevenmacher is twinned with:
 Aubière, France

Notable people 
 Frantz Seimetz (1858–1934) a Luxembourg Impressionist portrait and landscape artist
 Joseph Lortz (1887–1975) a Roman Catholic church historian, Reformation historian and ecumenist
 Marcel Paulus (1920–1987) a Luxembourgian footballer, competed in the 1948 Summer Olympics
 Rob Krier (born 1938) a Luxembourgian sculptor, architect and urban designer
 Octavie Modert (born 1966) a politician from Luxembourg

See also
Hagelsdorf

References

External links

 

 
Cities in Luxembourg
Communes in Grevenmacher (canton)
Towns in Luxembourg